In Greek mythology, Deipylus may refer to two distinct characters:

 Deipylus, son of Jason and Hypsipyle, daughter of King Thoas of Lemnos. He was the twin brother of Euneus. In some accounts, he was called Thoas or Nebrophonus.

 Deipylus, a Thracian prince as the son of King Polymestor of the Bistonians and Iliona, eldest daughter of King Priam of Troy. He was brought up by his mother as her own brother together with Polydorus, youngest son of Priam and brother of Iliona. The latter reared his brother as her own son so that if anything happened to either of them, she could give the other to her parents. Later on, Deipylus was killed by his own father Polymestor, who was bribed by the Achaeans, thinking that he was Polydorus

Notes

References 

 Apollodorus, The Library with an English Translation by Sir James George Frazer, F.B.A., F.R.S. in 2 Volumes, Cambridge, MA, Harvard University Press; London, William Heinemann Ltd. 1921. ISBN 0-674-99135-4. Online version at the Perseus Digital Library. Greek text available from the same website.
 Gaius Julius Hyginus, Fabulae from The Myths of Hyginus translated and edited by Mary Grant. University of Kansas Publications in Humanistic Studies. Online version at the Topos Text Project.
 Publius Ovidius Naso, The Epistles of Ovid. London. J. Nunn, Great-Queen-Street; R. Priestly, 143, High-Holborn; R. Lea, Greek-Street, Soho; and J. Rodwell, New-Bond-Street. 1813. Online version at the Perseus Digital Library.

Princes in Greek mythology
Lemnian characters in Greek mythology
Thracian characters in Greek mythology
Children of Jason